Bonabad may refer to:

 Bohnabad